Bolat Bidakhmetuly Zhamishev  (Bolat Bidahmetūly Zhämışev; born 28 June 1957) is a Kazakh politician who served as a Minister of Finance from 2007 to 2013, and Minister of Regional Development from 2013 to 2014. Since November 5, 2020 Chairman of the Board of Directors of Bank RBK JSC. Was appointed Chairman of the Kazakhstan Khalkyna Foundation, established after the January events of 2022 in Kazakhstan. 

Since February 17, 2022 he has headed the Samruk-Kazyna Public Council.

On July 4, 2022, he was elected a member of the Board of Directors, an independent director of the Samruk-Kazyna Foundation.

Personal life 
Zhamishev was born in 1957. He is an alumnus of the Kazakh Agriculture Institute, and has a PhD in economics. Following graduation, he was involved in scientific research. He held positions of a National Bank Department Vice Head, Vice Minister of Labor and Social Protection, First Vice Minister of Finance, Vice Minister of Internal Affairs, Vice Chairman of the National Bank, Chairman of the Agency for Supervision over Financial Market and Financial Institutions. Before being appointed Finance Minister in November 2007, he served as Vice Chairman of the Executive Board of the Eurasian Bank for Development. He is married and has two sons, Daulet and Kuanysh.

References 
 Кадровые назначения 

1957 births
Living people
Ministers of Finance (Kazakhstan)
Ministers of Regional development (Kazakhstan)
People from Almaty